High, Just-as-High, and Third (Old Norse: Hárr , Jafnhárr , and Þriði , respectively) are three men that respond to questions posed by Gangleri (described as king Gylfi in disguise) in the Prose Edda book Gylfaginning. The three figures sit upon thrones; High upon the lowest, Just-As-High on the mid-highest, and Third on the highest of the thrones.

It is stated in Chapter 20 of Gylfaginning (translation by Anthony Faulkes) that these names are pseudonyms employed by Odin:

See also
Hár and Hárr
List of names of Odin

References

Characters in Norse mythology
Names of Odin